Julia Jekyll and Harriet Hyde was a British children's television series which aired on BBC One (via Children's BBC and later CBBC) in the UK for 53 episodes between 1995 and 1998.

The programme was a comedy with its premise being loosely based on Robert Louis Stevenson's Gothic 1886 novella, Strange Case of Dr Jekyll and Mr Hyde.

Plot

Olivia Hallinan plays an intelligent schoolgirl named Julia Jekyll who makes a special drink called an elixir for a science project, but two school bullies named Nicola and Sharon known as "The Blister Sisters" sabotage her experiment by adding a hair restoring formula to it. When Julia sips the drink during a demonstration, she turns into a huge hairy monster named Harriet Hyde that scares the living daylights out of most of the people around her, even though she is harmless and friendly to most. Julia's parents Jerry and Moira (who has a tendency to repeat herself literally whenever someone says "You can say that again.") are fond of Harriet and believe she is Julia's friend, not knowing that Harriet and Julia were the same person. However their next-door neighbours, Jason and Mona Jitter, a neurotic couple who spent most of their time at a therapist's, were terrified of Harriet and had numerous unfortunate encounters with her. The Blister sisters repeatedly plot to get rid of Harriet but usually end up on the receiving end of her wrath, mostly being flung headfirst across the room.

The effects of Harriet Hyde usually wear off after a while but unexpectedly keep coming back. Julia's best friend and fellow student from Rocket Academy, Edward Knickers is the only one who knows her secret and she has hard work trying to hide it from her parents, next door neighbours, the teachers and all the other fellow students whilst she tries to find a cure. Julia can often recognise when she is about to transform into Harriet and manages to hide away from everyone else (for example by pretending she is going to be sick and having to leave the room). Teachers at the Rocket Academy were the jolly hippie headmaster Memphis Rocket, his doting elderly mother who is a horrendous cook, and Lester Blister, the Blister sisters' cruel and scheming uncle who wishes to take over the school.

Main cast

Episodes

Series 1 (1995-1996)

Series 2 (1996)

Series 3 (1998)

References

External links
Julia Jekyll And Harriet Hyde – from The bbc.co.uk Guide to Comedy.  Retrieved 8 January 2007.
Episode guide

BBC children's television shows
British children's comedy television series
1995 British television series debuts
1998 British television series endings
1990s British children's television series
British television shows featuring puppetry
English-language television shows
Television series based on Strange Case of Dr Jekyll and Mr Hyde
Television series about children